Jordan Sand is an American Japanologist. He is a professor of Japanese history and culture at Georgetown University with a focus on the architectural and cultural history of Japan.

Biography 
Sand received his B.A. and Ph.D. from Columbia University, and a M.E. from the University of Tokyo in architectural history. His specialization is the urban and architectural history of Japan. He is also an affiliated researcher at Waseda University.

His book, House and Home in Modern Japan (2004), received the 2005 John Whitney Hall Book Prize, 2005 Alice Davis Hitchcock Award, and the 2004 John K. Fairbank Prize.

Sand received a Guggenheim Fellowship in 2022 to finish writing a book about the Ise Grand Shrine.

References 

Living people
Georgetown University faculty
Columbia College (New York) alumni
Columbia Graduate School of Arts and Sciences alumni
University of Tokyo alumni
Academic staff of Waseda University
American Japanologists
Historians of Japan
Year of birth missing (living people)